Qarnabad (also Romanized as Qarnābād) is a village in Estarabad-e Jonubi Rural District, in the Central District of Gorgan County, Golestan Province, Iran. At the 2006 census, its population was 1,961, in 507 families.

References 

Populated places in Gorgan County